Larry Garner (born July 8, 1952 in New Orleans, Louisiana, United States) is a Louisiana blues musician best known for his 1994 album Too Blues.

Biography
Garner grew up in Baton Rouge, Louisiana. His first inspiration was the guitar-playing preacher Reverend Utah Smith. Garner made acquaintance with local musicians such as Lonesome Sundown, Silas Hogan, Guitar Kelley and Tabby Thomas. His musical influences include Hogan, Clarence Edwards, Jimi Hendrix, and Henry Gray. He was taught to play guitar by his uncle and two other elders. Garner completed military service in Korea and returned to Baton Rouge, working part-time in music and full-time at a Dow Chemical plant.

Garner won the International Blues Challenge in 1988. His first two albums, Double Dues and Too Blues, were released by the British JSP label. The latter album's title was in reply to a label executive who judged Garner's original demo to be "too blues". Thomas's nightclub, Tabby's Blues Box, provided Garner with a playing base in the 1980s and gave him the subject matter for the song "No Free Rides" on Double Dues.

He recorded the albums You Need to Live a Little (1996), Standing Room Only (1998), Baton Rouge (1995) and Once Upon the Blues (2000). The song "Go to Baton Rouge", from the album Baton Rouge, offered a tourist's guide to Louisiana music spots.

In 2008, Garner was treated for a serious illness that was the inspiration for his 2008 album, Here Today Gone Tomorrow.

Discography
All eight of Garner's CDs have been released by labels in Europe or Britain:
Too Blues (1994), JSP
Double Dues (1995), JSP
You Need to Live a Little (1996), Polygram
Standing Room Only (1998), Ruf
Baton Rouge (1995), Evidence
Once Upon the Blues (2000), Ruf
Embarrassment to the Blues?, live album (2002), Ruf
Here Today Gone Tomorrow (2008), Dixiefrog
Larry Garner, Norman Beaker and Friends: Live at the Tivoli, recorded at the Tivoli Theatre, Wimborne Minster, 8 October 2009 (2010)
Blues for Sale (2012), Dixiefrog

See also
Louisiana blues

References

1952 births
Living people
Blues musicians from Louisiana
American blues guitarists
American male guitarists
American blues singers
Songwriters from Louisiana
Blues musicians from New Orleans
Louisiana blues musicians
Swamp blues musicians
Musicians from Baton Rouge, Louisiana
Dow Chemical Company employees
Singers from Louisiana
Guitarists from Louisiana
20th-century American guitarists
20th-century American male musicians
JSP Records artists
Ruf Records artists
PolyGram artists
American male songwriters